Waikato Museum is a regional museum located in Hamilton, New Zealand. The museum manages ArtsPost, a shop and gallery space for New Zealand art and design. Both are managed by the Hamilton City Council. Outside the museum is The Tongue of The Dog, a sculpture by Michael Parekowhai that has helped to increase visitor numbers. The sculpture was commissioned by MESH Sculpture Trust, Hamilton.

Building and History
The current Waikato Museum building is located at 1 Grantham Street in Hamilton’s central business district on the west bank of the Waikato River. It was designed by Ivan Mercep of the Auckland architectural firm JASMad Group Ltd (now named Jasmax) who later designed Te Papa.

Waikato Museum of Art and History opened in its current building in 1987. The event was the culmination of years of planning and debate surrounding the need for a combined regional museum and art gallery. The name of the institution has since been changed to Waikato Museum Te Whare Taonga O Waikato, to better reflect and honour the local iwi (tribe) Tainui. The museum is situated on Ngaati Wairere land, a haapuu (sub-tribe) of Waikato, Tainui. Of major significance to the museum's history is the Kiingitanga (The King Movement). The museum is kaitiaki or caretakers of taonga tuku iho (rare and sacred objects). 

The interior and exterior of the museum building are inspired by and integrated with the environment. The design is oriented toward the steep riverbank on which the museum is situated. This approach is in keeping with Hamilton’s long-term urban strategy to enhance its river frontage.

ArtsPost is located on Victoria Street next to the museum and occupies Hamilton’s former Post and Telegraph office. Designed by architect John Campbell, it was built 1901 for a cost of £2,400. Hamilton City Council purchased the building in 1992 to create a high profile facility for the promotion of the visual arts. In consultation with the Historic Places Trust, the building was restored and ArtsPost opened on 27 June 1998.

Museum directors 

 Ken Gorbey 1971–1983

Exhibitions, Education and Public Programmes
Waikato Museum offers a range of exhibitions (curated in-house and touring), as well as a full complement of education and public programmes. Waikato Museum’s education, collections and research, and public programmes have four area of focus: art, social history, science, and tangata whenua. The overall aim of the institution is to reflect the passions, history, heritage and culture of the Waikato region.

Highlights for visitors include the majestic 200-year-old waka taua (war canoe) Te Winika and accompanying interpretation; Exscite and Milk Matters, interactive science galleries for children; and Te Whaanau Marama, a celebration of Maaori astronomy.

In April 2015, the museum opened a major exhibition to mark the centenary of the World War I. Funded by a grant from the Lotteries Commission, For Us They Fell tells the untold stories of the Waikato men who served in the Great War and the families they left behind.

The museum offers a range of events including artist talks, workshops and a popular school holiday programme during each of the four mid-term holidays. Since 2010, the museum has hosted Bat Tours, supported by the Waikato Regional Council. Participants enjoy a presentation before being led on a tour to the bat-nesting site and can have encounters with longtailed bats, glow worms, shortfin eels and other native species.

Since 2006 Waikato Museum have hosted the National Contemporary Art Award (NCAA) that was started by the Waikato Society of Arts in 2000 (formally the award was called the Trust Waikato National Contemporary Art Awards). NCAA attracts entries from New Zealand artists both based in New Zealand and overseas. Past winners include Ayesha Green (2019), Boris Dornbusch (2007), Dieneke Jansen (2013) and  Kim Pieters (2017).

Landing 
In 2021 a $1.03m floating pontoon on the Waikato River was opened, just below the museum. Its structure includes 5 decorated pou, representing stories from Ngāti Māhanga, Ngāti Tamainupō, Ngāti Wairere, Ngāti Korokī Kahukura and Ngāti Hauā. On 19 July 2021 a ferry began, linking the landing with Swarbrick's Landing, Braithwaite Park and Hamilton Gardens.

References

External links

ArtsPost website

Museums established in 1987
Buildings and structures in Hamilton, New Zealand
Culture in Hamilton, New Zealand
Tourist attractions in Hamilton, New Zealand
Art museums and galleries in New Zealand
History museums in New Zealand
Science museums in New Zealand
Art galleries in New Zealand
Museums in Waikato

1987 establishments in New Zealand
1980s architecture in New Zealand